Listen to the Lion is a 1977 short feature from Australia.

Plot
A Sydney derelict lies drunk in an alley and is beaten up by thugs. A friend helps him find refuge in a night shelter. As he lies dying he has a vision of himself flying about the room. The man dies and after the cremation of his corpse, his spirit returns to the footpath.

Cast
Wyn Roberts as Hunter
Barry Lovett as one legged man
Syd Heylen as Hunter's friend
John Derum as evangelist

Production
The film was written by Robert Hill, a former journalist who spent months researching the life of homeless people in Sydney. A substantial portion of the budget was provided by the General Production Fund of the Australian Film Commission.

Reception
The film won Greater Union Award for Best Fiction Film at the 1977 Sydney Film Festival and the Robert Mamoulian Award for the most distinguished Australian short film.

Although shot before Storm Boy (1976), also directed by Henri Safran, it was not released until after that film.

References

External links

Listen to the Lion at Oz Movies

Films directed by Henri Safran
1977 films
Australian drama short films
Films set in Sydney
1970s English-language films
1970s Australian films